M4M may refer to:

M4M (band), a Mandopop boy band
Measure for Measure, a 1603 comedy by William Shakespeare
M4M, an abbreviation in personal advertisements indicating a male seeking a male
 M4M, an abbreviation for machine-for-machine to describe the data intended to service machine to machine communications